Deanna A. Archuleta (born 1964) is an oil and gas development lobbyist and former American government official who served as the deputy assistant secretary for water and science in the Department of the Interior and former senior adviser to the secretary of the interior. From New Mexico, she served as a member of the Bernalillo County Board of Commissioners and was a candidate for mayor of Albuquerque in 2017.

Career 
Before her appointment to the department, Archuleta was the southwest regional director for the Wilderness Society, which promoted land conservation and environmental protection throughout the region. She also served on President-elect Barack Obama's Transition Team in Washington, D.C.

In May 2009, Archuleta was appointed by President Barack Obama to serve as deputy assistant secretary for water and science in the Department of the Interior. As Deputy Assistant Secretary, Archuleta was the supervisor of the United States Geological Survey. Overseeing the USGS also included the $1.1 billion budget for 2010, 2011, and 2012. As well as managing the Earthquake Hazards Program.
  
From January 2008 to April 2009, Archuleta served as board chair of the Bernalillo County Water Utility, overseeing the completion of the San Juan Chama Drinking Water Project.

Archuleta served as a member of the Bernalillo County Board of Commissioners from January 2005 until April 2009, and was elected to serve as the chair of the commission in 2009.

She currently works as the Senior Director for Federal Relations for ExxonMobil.

2017 mayoral election 

Deanna Archuleta was a candidate for mayor of Albuquerque in the 2017 election. Archuleta was the first candidate to declare in May 2016. Archuleta was one of 9 candidates that have collected enough signatures to be placed on the ballot for mayor. Because of her father's failing health, Archuleta chose to drop out of the mayoral race on May 26, 2017.

References 

Living people
New Mexico Democrats
University of New Mexico alumni
United States Department of the Interior officials
Politicians from Albuquerque, New Mexico
Politicians from Santa Fe, New Mexico
1964 births